Carbia nexilinea is a moth in the  family Geometridae. It is found in the north-eastern Himalayas and on the Andamans and Borneo. The habitat consists of lowland areas.

References

Moths described in 1898
Eupitheciini
Moths of Asia